State Route 188 (SR 188) is a  east–west state highway located in the central part of the U.S. state of Ohio.  SR 188's western terminus is in Circleville at a signalized intersection where it meets the concurrency of U.S. Route 22 (US 22) and SR 56.  Its eastern terminus is at a signalized intersection with SR 204 in the central business district of the village of Thornville.

Route description
SR 188 traverses the eastern part of Pickaway County, then through the western, central and northeastern portions of Fairfield County and finally the northwestern corner of Perry County.  No segment of SR 188 is included as a part of the National Highway System (NHS).  The NHS is a network of routes deemed to be most important for the economy, mobility and defense of the nation.

History
SR 188 was designated in 1927.  When it was first designated, it was routed along its present alignment between Circleville and Lancaster, following what had been previously designated as a portion of SR 158.  In 1937, SR 188 was extended to the northeast from Lancaster along what was at the time an un-numbered roadway to its current eastern terminus at SR 204 in Thornville.

Major intersections

References

188
Transportation in Pickaway County, Ohio
Transportation in Fairfield County, Ohio
Transportation in Perry County, Ohio